Maurice Vaughn may refer to:

 Maurice Vaughn, alternative name of Sunny Skylar, American composer (1913-2009)
 Mo Vaughn (born 1967),Major League Baseball first baseman
 Maurice John Vaughn (born 1952), American blues musician